"Delete" is a song recorded by Serbian pop recording artist Dara Bubamara. It was self-released 25 December 2012 and was featured as a bonus track on her twelfth studio album Dara 2013, released by City Records. The song was written by Miloš Roganović. It was produced and recorded in Belgrade.

Bubamara premiered the song on the Ami G Show, hosted by Ognjen Amidžić, as a New Year's gift to her fans. The song's title is in the English language and is the only English word used in the song.

References

External links
Delete at Discogs

2012 singles
2012 songs
Serbian pop songs